The Nemzeti dal ("National Song") is a Hungarian patriotic poem written by Sándor Petőfi that is said to have inspired the Hungarian Revolution of 1848. Petőfi read the poem aloud on March 15 on the steps of the Hungarian National Museum in Budapest to a gathering crowd, who by the end were chanting the refrain as they began to march around the city, seizing the presses, liberating political prisoners, and declaring the end of Austrian rule.

Hungarians celebrate the anniversary of the revolution on March 15. Red-white-green ribbons are worn to commemorate the fallen revolutionaries and the ideal of the revolution. Hungary briefly achieved independence from 1848–1849, but was defeated by the combined forces of the Habsburgs and the Russian Empire. Despite its ultimate defeat, the revolution initiated a chain of events that led to the autonomy of Hungary within the new Austro-Hungarian Empire in 1867.

The poem has come to rank third after the Himnusz and Szózat as a statement of Hungarian national identity.

The translation below of the "National Poem" is literal, attempting to convey the precise meaning of the original text.

References

Hungarian poetry
Hungarian patriotic songs